Giuseppe Milazzo (born 21 August 1977 in Palermo) is an Italian politician who was elected as a member of the European Parliament in 2019.

References

Living people
1977 births
MEPs for Italy 2019–2024
Forza Italia (2013) politicians